WXTH-LP is a Religious formatted broadcast radio station licensed to Richwood, West Virginia, serving Richwood and Fenwick in West Virginia.  WXTH-LP is owned and operated by Riverside Baptist Church.

References

External links
 Heavenly Radio Online
 

2014 establishments in West Virginia
Radio stations established in 2014
XTH-LP
Nicholas County, West Virginia